Papazyan (in Armenian Փափազյան) (in Western Armenian Papazian, Փափազեան) is a surname of Armenian origin. 

Notable people with the surname include:

Papazyan
Arutyun Papazyan (born 1954), Armenian pianist
Vahram Papazyan (athlete) (1892-1986), one of two athletes who represented Turkey in the 1912 Summer Olympics

Papazian
Aghavni Papazian (floruit 1879), Ottoman Armenian actress
Arousyak Papazian (1841-1907), Ottoman Armenian actress
Charlie Papazian, American nuclear engineer and homebrewer
Haig Papazian, Lebanese Armenian violinist, member of the Lebanese alternative rock band Mashrou' Leila
Marty Papazian, American actor
Mary Papazian, American administrator and professor in English
Vahan Papazian (1876-1973), Armenian political activist 
Vahram Papazian (1886–1968), Soviet Armenian actor
Vrtanes Papazian (1866–1920), Armenian writer, historian, activist, translator, literary critic and editor

Armenian-language surnames